Pseudobromus is a genus of African plants in the grass family.
 
 Species
 Pseudobromus africanus (Hack.) Stapf 
 Pseudobromus ambilobensis A.Camus
 Pseudobromus breviligulatus Stapf ex A.Camus
 Pseudobromus engleri (Pilg.) Clayton
 Pseudobromus humbertianus A.Camus
 Pseudobromus tenuifolius A.Camus

References

Pooideae
Poaceae genera